The High School for Math, Science and Engineering at City College (often abbreviated to High School for Math, Science and Engineering, HSMSE, or HSMSE @ CCNY) is one of the twelve public specialized high schools in New York City, United States. It caters to highly gifted students from across the city. It is located within the campus of the City College of New York (CCNY).

Created in 2002 along with Queens High School for the Sciences at York College, and High School of American Studies at Lehman College, HSMSE was founded with an emphasis on engineering and design, and was envisioned as a small school with approximately four hundred students. The relatively small population of the school allows students and teachers to have a stronger relationship.

Facilities and curriculum

HSMSE is a highly selective, public, college prep high school, and is one of nine specialized high schools in New York City. Admission is via the Specialized High Schools Admissions Test. Instructionally supported by the City College of New York, the school mainly focuses on an intensive STEM curriculum, while also emphasizing civic responsibility and the value of knowledge. As of 2021, it had a 100% four-year graduation rate.

Located on the campus of City College, HSMSE is small, with a total of approximately 485 students in ninth to twelfth grade. The school is located on four floors of the CCNY campus' Baskerville Hall.  Class sizes are small, with an average of approximately 24 students per class. In addition to a rigorous core subject program emphasizing math, science and the humanities, all students are required to take a minimum of three engineering core courses through 11th grade sponsored by Project Lead the Way.

German program
German is the core language taught at HSMSE, which has one of the largest high school German programs in the United States. HSMSE’s founders believed that German is the language of engineering. As a result, about 75% of HSMSE students study German, which is offered through the Advanced Placement level, and many of them continue to study German in college. The school employs two full-time German teachers and is one of nine US partner schools of the PASCH program of the Goethe Institut through its "Schools: Partners for the Future" program. Every summer, HSMSE sends a few students on funded study trips to Germany with the Goethe Institute and the American Association of Teachers of German. The school also offers advanced Spanish for students who pass the Second Language Proficiency (SLP) exam in Spanish in middle school. Those students begin Spanish at the second-year level.

Transportation
The New York City Subway's 137th Street-City College, 135th Street, and 145th Street stations are located nearby. Additionally, New York City Bus's  routes stop near HSMSE. Students residing a certain distance from the school are provided full-fare or half-fare student MetroCards for public transportation.

Student life
HSMSE has a diverse student body - in 2013 it was estimated to be the most diverse in New York City with 130 Asians, 75 blacks, 99 Hispanics and 101 whites. HSMSE is a school where students of all ethnic and economic backgrounds mingle comfortably. The faculty is notably dedicated, many devoting personal time to mentor students, to coach teams and to support extracurricular activities. Support mechanisms are in place for students who struggle, through informal peer tutoring as well as through daily tutoring sessions offered by every teacher.

Virtually all of HSMSE’s diverse, high-achieving students go on to college, many of them to highly competitive colleges. As part of the school's efforts to increase diversity, the Discover program expansion in 2018 offers admission to students who otherwise didn't score highly enough on the test.

Rankings
HSMSE was ranked the city's third best public high school in The New York Posts annual school ranking. In 2013, HSMSE was ranked among the nation's top high schools by the U.S. News & World Report,  and in 2017, the U.S. News & World Report ranked HSMSE as third in New York State and 26th nationally.

In May 2013, HSMSE was ranked #1 in the country by Working in Support of Education (w!se) for personal finance education. HSMSE was ranked by w!se as first in the nation in financial literacy in 2017.

Graduate accomplishments
In 2016, senior Kelly Hyles was accepted to all eight Ivy League colleges.
In 2018, Jin Kyu Park was awarded a Rhodes Scholarship, becoming the first DACA recipient to win a Rhodes Scholarship. Additionally, Park was the first HSMSE graduate to be accepted to Harvard University when he graduated in 2014.

References

External links
 HSMSE's official website

Educational institutions established in 2002
Public high schools in Manhattan
Specialized high schools in New York City
University-affiliated schools in the United States
2002 establishments in New York City
Schools in Harlem
City College of New York